Wilhelm Eduard Albrecht (4 March 1800 – 22 May 1876) was a German constitutional lawyer, jurist, and docent. Albrecht was most notable as a member of the Göttingen Seven, a group of academics who in 1837 protested against the abrogation of the constitution of the Kingdom of Hanover by King Ernest Augustus.

Albrecht was born in Elbing (Elbląg), West Prussia, and studied in Berlin, Göttingen, and Königsberg. He taught jurisprudence in Königsberg in 1829, relocating to Göttingen the following year. After his association with the Göttingen Seven in 1837, which resulted in his dismissal, he found work as a freelance lecturer in Leipzig. Here, in 1840, he became a professor of law.

In 1847 Albrecht joined the Lübeck chapter of the Germanistentage. In 1848, during the March Revolution, Albrecht was a member of the Frankfurt Parliament and a delegate to the Siebzehnerausschuss, whose constitution he prepared. From 18 May to 17 August he represented Harburg in the Frankfurt Parliament, where he allied himself with the Casino faction.

In 1863 Albrecht was appointed to the Geheim Hofrat (approx. "Secret Advisory Council"), shortly before his retirement in 1868.

Albrecht remains a significant figure in jurisprudence for his conception of the state as a purely theoretical legal entity, a view he developed in an 1837 review of Romeo Maurenbrecher's "Grundsätze des heutigen Staatsrechts". This view stands in opposition to the old Germanic concept of the state as Verbandsperson, a collective person, a position defended by Otto von Gierke.

His father in law was the astronomer Christian Ludwig Ideler.

References
 Anke Borsdorff: Wilhelm Eduard Albrecht, Lehrer und Verfechter des Rechts. Leben und Werk. Centaurus-Verlags-Gesellschaft, Pfaffenweiler 1993, 
 Heinrich Best, Wilhelm Weege: Biographisches Handbuch der Abgeordneten der Frankfurter Nationalversammlung 1848/49. Düsseldorf: Droste-Verlag,  1998. (S. 81)

External links 

Biography from the Göttingen archive

1800 births
1876 deaths
People from Elbląg
Dissidents
19th-century German lawyers
People from West Prussia
Humboldt University of Berlin alumni
University of Göttingen alumni
Academic staff of the University of Göttingen
University of Königsberg alumni
Academic staff of the University of Königsberg
Academic staff of Leipzig University
Members of the Frankfurt Parliament
Members of the First Chamber of the Diet of the Kingdom of Saxony